Mavis Staples is the debut solo studio by American rhythm and blues and gospel singer Mavis Staples. It was released on June 16, 1969, by Volt Records.

Critical reception

Cashbox published a review of the album in the issue dated June 28, 1969, which said, "Mavis Staples, of the famed Staple Singers gospel group, goes solo and soul in this Steve Cropper-produced set, and the album's appeal could easily spread to the underground/contemporary market. Mavis unleashes a trained, experienced and powerful voice on such items as "The Choking Kind," "A House Is Not a Home," "Son of a Preacher Man," "Chained," "Security" and "You Send Me."

Track listing

Personnel
Adapted from the album liner notes.
 James Alexander - bass
 Barry Beckett - keyboards
 Al Bell - producer
 Ron Capone - engineer
 Steve Cropper - producer, arranger, guitar
 Donald "Duck" Dunn - bass
 Willie Hall - drums
 Roger Hawkins - drums
 Isaac Hayes - organ
 Edward Hinton - guitar
 David Hood - bass
 Al Jackson, Jr. - drums
 Beverly Parker - cover design
 Bob Smith - cover photography
 Mavis Staples - lead vocals
 Marvell Thomas - piano
 Honeya Thompson - art direction

References

Mavis Staples albums
1969 debut albums
Albums produced by Steve Cropper
Albums produced by Al Bell